The City of Darebin is a local government area in Victoria, Australia, in the northern suburbs of Melbourne. Municipal offices are located at 350 High Street, Preston.

Darebin was rated 386th of 590 Australian Local Government Areas in the BankWest Quality of Life Index 2008.

History

The City of Darebin was formed in 1994 with the merger of most of the former Cities of Northcote and Preston, with the transfer of the portion of the City of Northcote  of Heidelberg Road to the City of Yarra and minor adjustments with the former Cities of Coburg, Heidelberg and the Shire of Diamond Valley.

Council

Until the 2016 elections, Darebin Council elections were dominated by the Labor Party (ALP). At the first City of Darebin election in 1996 and at subsequent elections in 1998, 2002 and 2004 only ALP member candidates were successful. The ALP endorsed candidates for the very first Darebin Council elections, but in subsequent elections the local party organisation supported particular candidates in each contested ward. The decision of the party not to endorse candidates almost certainly arises from the performance of the very first elected council, in which a deal between ALP factions determined the preselection of the party's council candidates.

Dissatisfaction with the performance of the first Darebin Council led to the Kennett Government holding an Inquiry under David Elsum, which reported to the Victorian Parliament in April 1997. The Elsum Report found that factional differences led to poor governance on the Council. As a result, the Kennett Government sacked the Council and appointed a commissioner, but decided to return to an elected council about eighteen months later in 1998.

The council consisted of nine single-Councillor wards at each of the four elections totally dominated by the ALP. In 2008, following a representation review by the Victorian Electoral Commission (VEC), Darebin was divided into three wards comprising three councillors in each elected by proportional representation. For the first time the ALP stranglehold was broken with the election of Trent McCarthy, a Greens candidate, to the Rucker Ward. In 2012, the ALP stranglehold was further weakened with the election of independents Julie Williams and Bo Li elected to the Cazaly Ward, along with Oliver Walsh, a Liberal Party member, elected to the Rucker Ward. Later in that term, Vince Fontana of Cazaly Ward and Gaetano Greco of La Trobe Ward quit the ALP, leaving only three ALP members, Tim Laurence, Steven Tsitas and Angela Villella, on the Council.

The first election in 1996 was by attendance voting. Postal voting has been used at each subsequent election.

ALP factions provided much of the interest in Darebin politics, given that the ALP has traditionally been in a commanding position within the municipality. Two councillors elected from the Right or Labor Unity faction, Nazih Elasmar and Marlene Kairouz, were subsequently elected to the Victorian Parliament. Both Elasmar and Kairouz have at various times served as Mayor of Darebin, Kairouz having held the office of Mayor on two occasions.

At the first Darebin Council Election no faction held control, with four councillors from the Preston area being members of the Labor Unity (Right) faction, four councillors from the Northcote area being members of the Socialist Left, and one Councillor from the Preston area being a member of the Pledge faction, a breakaway group from the Socialist Left frequently voting with the Right. After elections in 1998, 2002 and 2004 the Labor Unity group held almost all Council positions, but complications existed within Labor Unity as two sub-factions competed for dominance and for the election of Mayor. In 2008, with the introduction of the proportional representation voting system, no faction again held dominance.

Current councillors
Coming into effect at the 2020 council elections, Darebin was divided into nine single-member wards, each elected through preferential voting. Prior to this, councillors were elected from three multi-member wards.

Election results

2020 election results

Townships and localities
The 2021 census, the city had a population of 148,570 up from 146,719 in the 2016 census

^ - Territory divided with another LGA

Economy of Darebin

The 2012 Business Register states that Darebin currently has 11,575 businesses operating within the region. These businesses create 55,278 jobs for locals and residents of Melbourne, and the Darebin area itself has 74,291 employed residents. Darebin had a Gross Regional Product of A$5.23 billion in 2012, a 0.3% increase on the previous year. Since 2001, approximately A$1 billion of extra GRP has been created in the region. The biggest exports in Darebin are:

 Manufacturing ($1,072 million)
 Education & training ($313 million)
 Wholesale trade ($243 million)

Since 2006, gentrification in the Darebin area has seen average incomes and property values increase significantly in the region, particularly in the suburbs of Northcote, Fairfield, Alphington and Thornbury. As a result, there has been a dramatic change in the economy of Darebin and the types of businesses that operate. For example, since 2006, there has been increases in the total exports of the following industry sectors:

 Accommodation & food services – 49% increase ($39 million to $88.8 million)
 Wholesale trade – 39.4% increase ($203 million to $243 million)

Darebin also experienced growth thanks to the mining boom, with a 57% increase in mining-relating exports from 2006 to 2012, despite there being no mines in the municipality.

Of the 11,575 registered businesses in Darebin, the most common industry sectors are:

Construction – 1,992 registered businesses (17.2%)
Professional, scientific & technical services – 1,442 registered businesses (12.3%)
Rental, hiring & real estate services – 1,167 registered businesses (10.1%)
Transport, postal & warehousing – 1,031 registered businesses (8.9%)

Demographics of Darebin

As of 2012, Darebin has 144,086 residents living in its boundaries which include 5,344 hectares or 53 km². This gives the area of Darebin a population density of 26.96 persons per hectare. 
Darebin residents have a median age of 36 and earn on average $1,178 per week. According to the 2011 Australian Bureau of Statistics census, in Darebin:

 28% of households are couples with children. (4% lower than Victorian average)
 34% live in Medium/High density housing (11% higher than Victorian average)
 34%  of residents rent their property (8% higher than Victorian average)
 28% have a bachelor's degree or Higher (7% higher than Victorian average)
 21% travel on Public Transport to work (10% higher than Victorian average)
 29% from Non-English speaking backgrounds (9% higher than Victorian average)

The most common occupations in Darebin are:

Professionals (28.7%)
Clerical & Administrative Workers (14.7%)
Technicians & Trade Workers (12.0%)

With gentrification, more educated and affluent residents are moving to the Darebin area, particularly in the suburbs of Northcote and Fairfield. This has seen a marked change in the occupations of residents in Darebin since 2006. There has been a decline in the number of residents employed in manual labour sectors and an increase in the number of residents employed in managerial, professional and community service sectors. This is also related to the number of residents living in Darebin with tertiary education, with a 6% increase in residents with degrees in the last 7 years. Furthermore, the largest increase in residents in Darebin came from those earning in the top 25%, with a 3.4% increase in these households since 2006.

Darebin has a diverse multicultural population, with 33.7% of residents being born overseas. The most common countries of birth are:

Italy (5.3%)
Greece (3.7%)
India (3.3%)
China (3.2%)

26% of Darebin residents also arrived in Australia within the last 5 years.

Darebin as a region is home to many environmentalists, and this, along with Darebin's proximity to the Melbourne CBD, is reflected in the transportation methods used by Darebin residents compared to Melbourne as a whole. Most residents still drive to work, with 50.1% of residents driving alone to work, however this is 10% lower than the Greater Melbourne average. Furthermore, 14.2% of Darebin residents travel to work by bus, compared to 11.9% in the rest of Melbourne. Darebin residents also walk to work, cycle to work or catch other modes of public transport more often than the rest of Melbourne. Since 2006, the largest single increase in transportation use has been in train travel, with 2,423 more residents catching the train, compared to 2,416 new vehicle drivers. This is the largest increase in Victoria.

Arts and entertainment

Darebin City has an active artist community which is contemporary, experimental and culturally diverse. Writers, musicians and visual artists flock to the locality for performance, collaboration and acceptance. Notable contributors to the Darebin arts community are locals, Rose Turtle Ertler, Sundown and/or Last Stand, The Contrast, The Melbourne Ukulele Kollective, DIY artshows and housegigs collective, Loveanarchistpress Publishing, Performing Older Women's Circus (POW Circus) and TRAX Arts.

Darebin celebrates the artistry and diversity of the community with regular festivals and events such as the Darebin Music Feast and the High Vibes festival. The city also funds community music, such as the Preston Symphony Orchestra and public artwork, such as the Fairfield Industrial Dog Object.

The Preston Markets are a central feature of Darebin and attract people from all around the area.

Controversies

Australia Day
In August 2017 the City of Darebin followed the City of Yarra Council in deciding not to celebrate Australia Day events. This was criticised by conservative commentators, with the Federal government subsequently removing the council's powers to hold citizenship ceremonies.

Same-sex marriage
In the lead-up to the Australian Marriage Law Postal Survey the council announced it will allow pro same-sex marriage campaigners to use its facilities and services (for free) and deny this access to those of an alternate view. This was criticised by conservative commentators but welcomed by community members.

The council subsequently reversed its plans to oppose those campaigning for the 'no' vote.

Men banned from applying for job
In September 2021, it was widely reported in the Australian media that the Darebin City Council had banned men from applying for a new position despite being an "equal opportunity employer".

2022 state election
During the 2022 Victorian state election Labor accused a 'Greens-dominated' Darebin council of removing Labor billboards in the seat of Northcote.

See also
 List of places on the Victorian Heritage Register in the City of Darebin

References

Population – Darebin City Council – Research and Statistics

External links
 
Official website
Metlink local public transport map
Link to Land Victoria interactive maps

Darebin Council Waste Management photos

Darebin City Council

Local government areas of Melbourne
Greater Melbourne (region)